MasterChef Turkey (MasterChef Türkiye) is a Turkish competitive cooking game show based on the original British MasterChef. Its first season was broadcast on Show TV, but since 2018 it has been screened on TV8. Chefs Murat Bozok, Batuhan Piatti and Erol Kaynar served as the first season's judges, which was presented by Öykü Serter. For the show's second season in 2018, Mehmet Yalçınkaya, Hazer Amani and Somer Sivrioğlu joined the program as the new judges. Amani was replaced by Danilo Zanna in 2019. Two different groups, Blue and Red, compete to win the main title.

Season 1 (2011)

Contestants

Season 2 (2018)

System in Season 2

This season is the first MasterChef season directed by Acun Ilıcalı, and unlike the first season, it is a much more modernized and detailed season.

Since it was broadcast on a completely different channel 7 years after the first season and has brand new staff and judges, this season is thought to be the first season.

Compared to its successors this season, it does not have a published its pre-qualifying process.

Cast
 Atakan Erbek
 Burcu Eminoğlu (Third place)
 Doruk Ulufer
 Ercan Demir
 Eslem Sena Yurt
 Esra Maydoğdu
 Ezgi Gürkaş
 Hakan Kanik (Fifth place)
 Kerem Giritlioğlu (Runner-up)
 Mehmet Sur
 Mehmet Alp Sıy
 Meltem Pisboğa (Fourth place)
 Murat Özdemir (Disqualified/Ninth place)
 Özlem Yüksektepe
 Tuğçe Sökesoğlu
 Uğur Kardaş (Winner)
 Umut Yeke
 Zeynep Palikoç

Season 3 (2019)

System in the Season 3

As of this season, Danilo Zanna has replaced Hazer Amani in the jury cast.

This season, compared to the previous two seasons, is the first season in which the pre-selection process of this competition has been broadcast.

Contestants will first go through an audition stage where the judges will cook within a certain period of time before the eyes of the judges, and the contestant who gets approval from at least two judges will move on to the next stage.
In the next stage, they will go through the triple duel stage in order to enter the main cast, the person who cooks the best food in that stage will pass to the main cast, while the others will be eliminated.

However, unlike previous seasons, it has a 'reserve cast' system in which some of the eliminated in the triple duel were recalled for the replacing main cast contestants who were eliminated.

Cast
 Açelya Kılıçay 
 Alican Sabunsoy (Runner-up)
 Bahri Papila 
 Batuhan Bayır (Fifth place) 
 Cemre Uyanık (Winner) 
 Eda Karabulut 
 Güzide Mertcan (Third place) 
 Ekin Eylem Ulaş (Fourth place) 
 Faruk Batuhan Öner 
 Kıvanç Ermiş 
 Murat Tokmak
 Mustafa Aydın 
 Müge Güney
 Onur Dursun 
 Orhan Eren 
 Rıfat Yurttaş
 Nalan Toprak 
 Suna Aydın
 Yasin Obuz
 Yekaterina Sungur

Season 4 (2020)

System in the Season 4

This season, unlike the previous season, the third qualifying stage called the 'final round' was introduced.

At this stage, the 28 winners of the triple duel were divided into two groups and 8 people were determined for the main squad from each group.

Successful contestants who failed to enter the main cast were included in the competition as reserve cast contestants. 
These contestants are: Sefa, Berker, Arem, Selin, Walison and Didem.

Contestants
 Arem Yüce
 Ayyüce Kamit 
 Barbaros Yoloğlu (Runner-up) 
 Berk İlter
 Berker Başmanav
 Celal Sarıgül
 Didem Devay 
 Duygu Acarsoy
 Ebru Has
 Emir Elidemir (Third place)
 Eray Aksungur (Fifth place)
 Esra Tokelli 
 Gülşah Suna
 Furkan Yalçın 
 Özgül Coşar (Fourth place) 
 Sedat Tuncer
 Sefa Okyay Kılıç
 Selin Öztürk Aydın
 Serhat Doğramacı (Winner)
 Tanya Kilitkayalı
 Uğur Yılmaz Deniz (Disqualified/Eighth place)
 Walison Fonseca

Season 5 (2021)

System in Season 5
Along with a chosen contestant by juries whose eliminated in the triple duel stage, 5 main cast contestants and 5 reserve cast contestants are selected from each group of 15 people.
Thus, the number of main cast and reserve cast contestants will be completed to 15.

The selected reserve cast contestants have to compete against each other each week to replace an eliminated contestant from the main cast.(in the first match, for to be the last contestant of the main cast)

The selection of the reserve cast is made before the qualifying day, but in terms of the rules it is the same as the final round stage.
In the last two reserve selections, the second stage, the creativity stage, is removed. Instead, the person who cooks the food requested by the chefs best is included in the main cast.

In addition, the 'loop round, in which the eliminated contestants are brought back, was introduced this season.  Two of the contestants eliminated before they reach the last ten in this round have a chance to be reintegrated into the main cast, thus reshaping the second turning point, the last twelve.

This season is the season where the elimination system is changed the most, and it is also the MasterChef season with the most reserve contestants called up. (13 reserve calling in total; 3 for final round, 7 for main cast, 2 for main cast in mid-to-end season )

Main Cast 
Fatma Polat
Milhan Erdem
Dilara Başaran (Fifth Place)
İbrahim Cingözler
Tunahan Ak
Sükrü Özsarı
Hamza Mercimek
Burcu Önal (Sixth Place)
Görkem Demiral
Hasan Biltekin (Runner-up)
Tahsin Küçük (Third Place)
Eren Kaşıkçı (Winner)
Mert Yılmaz
Safanur Bol
Emre Büber

Reserve Cast 
Nursima Toğaç
Berk Vural Urun
Mert Ateş Durukan
(Participated as 3'rd Reserve Contestant)
Sergen Özen
(Participated as 16'th Contestant/Fourth Place)
Mete Ozan Kibar
Azize Polat
(Participated as 2'nd Reserve Contestant)
Araz Aknam
(Participated as 4'th Reserve Contestant)
Samet Enes
Merve Karagül
Zerda Karagülle
Mustafa Ozan
(Participated as 1'st Reserve Contestant)
Melis Di Gennaro
Pelin Zaman
(Participated as 5'th Reserve Contestant)
Yiğit Gök
Rabia Nur Çamurlu
(Participated as 6'th Reserve Contestant)

Season 6 (2022)

System in Season 6

Slightly different from the previous season, they did not call a reserve contestants for the final round.
Instead, they choose 6 contestant from each batch of 16 contestants for the main cast, then they choose 5 contestants from each batch of remaining 10 contestants for the reserve cast.
Complete the number of main cast contestants to 18, reserve cast contestants to 15.

Since the number of main cast contestants for this season has been increased to 18, the number of reserve contestants to be recruited this season has been reduced to 5.
That's why it is the first season in which the number of reserve contestants is reduced.

Main Cast 
Metin Yavuz (winner)
Gamze Tosun
Onur Biçim
Çağatay Akgül
Şeyma Müjdeci
Melih Berkay Gündüz
Büsra Zambak
Fatma Nur Uçar
Tayfun Genç
Yağız Özçelik
Burak Revanbahş
Kaan Noyanalpan
Burak Kaya (Fifth place)
Dilan Karataş
Barış Demir
Kıvanç Karadeniz (runner-up)
Ayaz Geçer (third place)
Serpilay Salkım

Reserve Cast 

Doğukan Güneş
Atike Bozyaka
(Participated as 3'rd Reserve Contestant)
Başar Varol
Tolga Şener
(Participated as 4'th Reserve Contestant/Sixth Place)
Seyfullah Karagöz
(Withdrew)
Ege Pakalın
Vural Burnaz
(Participated as 2'nd Reserve Contestant)
Erkan Kalanyer
Ayşegül Zengin
Şule Yaman
(Participated as 5'th Reserve Contestant)
Makbule Cengiz
Görkem Ünal
(Participated as 1'st Reserve Contestant/Fourth Place)
Sema Fıçıcı
Göktuğ Çolak
Cenkay Ceviz

Series overview

References

External links 
 

MasterChef
Turkish game shows
2011 Turkish television series debuts
Cooking television series